is a Japanese voice actress from Osaka Prefecture. She is a freelance performer not affiliated with any one studio, and has provided voice work for a number of video games and other projects since beginning her career in 2004.

Works

Web anime
 Bakumatsu Kikansetsu Irohanihoheto (Girl 2)

Video games
 Battle Fantasia - Olivia, Odile
 Hexyz Force - Rafael Gemini
 Gurumin: A Monstrous Adventure - Parin
 Minna de Kitaeru Zenno Training - Voice
 Sangokushi Online - Other voices
 The Legend of Heroes: Trails in the Sky - Anelace Elfead
 Wrestling Angels - Sophie Sierra
 Mugen Souls Z - Ending theme

Other
 Sanrio character Cinnamoroll (Azuki)

References

External links
 Official blog

1983 births
Japanese voice actresses
Living people
People from Osaka Prefecture